HMS Minden was a Royal Navy 74-gun Ganges-class third-rate ship of the line, launched on 19 June 1810 from Bombay, India. She was named after the German town Minden and the Battle of Minden of 1759, a decisive victory of British and Prussian forces over France in the Seven Years' War. The town is about 75 km away from Hanover, from where the House of Hanover comes—the dynasty which ruled the United Kingdom from 1714 until 1901.

Construction

Jamsetjee Bomanjee Wadia of the Wadia Group built Minden. She was launched from the Duncan Docks  in Bombay, India, and was built of teak.

The Bombay Courier, 23 June 1810 wrote:“On Tuesday last His Majesty’s Ship, the Minden built in the new docks (Bombay) by Jamsetji Bomanji Wadia was floated into the stream at high water, after the usual ceremony of breaking the bottle had been performed by the Honorable Governor Jonathan Duncan. Also In having produced the Minden, Bombay is entitled to the distinguished praise of providing the first and only British ship of the line built out of the limits of the Mother Country; and in the opinion of very competent judges, the Minden, for beauty of construction and strength of frame, may stand in competition with any man-o-war that has come out of the most celebrated Dockyards of Great Britain. For the skill of its architects, for the superiority of its timber, and for the excellence of its docks, Bombay may now claim a distinguished place among naval arsenals”.

Service history
In March she sailed from Madras to take part in the invasion of Java. On 29 July two of her boats, under the command of Lieutenant Edmund Lyons, with only 35 officers and men aboard, attacked and captured the fort covering the harbour of Marrack, to the westward of Batavia. The Naval General Service Medal with the clasp "30 July Boat Service 1811" was issued to survivors of this action in 1848. The Dutch and French forces in Java surrendered in September. Minden then sailed for the UK and escorted convoys to the East Indies, the Cape of Good Hope, South America, and the coast of Africa.

Minden sailed from Portsmouth under Captain Alexander Skene on 6 August 1812 arriving at Madras, India on 29 January 1813 where she then served as the flagship of Vice Admiral Sir Samuel Hood, Commander in Chief of the East Indies Station. While there, she was first commanded by Captain William Webley, then by Captain Joseph Prior, and thereafter (20 April 1814) by Captain George Henderson (until 14 January 1815). "In the summer of 1814 [Admiral Hood] made a voyage, in his majesty’s ship Minden, to the eastern parts of his station.”  He eventually arrived at Semarang, Java on 29 June 1814. Hood then "sailed on the Minden from Batavia on 1 August 1814 for Madras, where he [later] died on 24 December of that year.”.  The Minden remained in the East Indies until September 1815 when she returned to England, arriving at Portsmouth on 4 February 1816.

(A few blogs and articles on the internet claim that Minden saw service during the War of 1812 in the Chesapeake Bay and  that Francis Scott Key was aboard her when he wrote the poem "Defense of Fort M'Henry", which became the lyrics for "The Star-Spangled Banner".

    A counter to those claims is given in the preceding paragraph, and in these sources):

In late July 1816 Minden sailed from Plymouth Sound, as part of an Anglo-Dutch fleet that made an attack on Algiers on 27 August. The Naval General Service Medal with the clasp "Algiers" was issued to survivors of this battle in 1848.

Minden then sailed for the East Indies, and was reported to be at Trincomalee in 1819. In July 1830 Minden was at Plymouth. She was commissioned there on 19 March 1836 and sailed for the Tagus joining the British squadron. In 1839 she was at Malta, returning to Plymouth in early 1840.

A typhoon destroyed the shore-based Royal Naval Hospital at Hong Kong on 22 July 1841, and Minden was commissioned at Plymouth in December 1841 to serve as a hospital ship there. Minden then served there as stores ship until sold for scrapping in August 1861.

In memory of the ship, two streets were named after her, Minden Row and Minden Avenue, located behind Signal Hill of Tsim Sha Tsui in Kowloon, Hong Kong.

Notes

References

Lavery, Brian (2003) The Ship of the Line - Volume 1: The development of the battlefleet 1650-1850. Conway Maritime Press. .

External links
 
Photo of a scale model of Minden 
 The American Connection to Minden Row (A brief history of HMS Minden)
The Royal Naval Hospital, Hong Kong

Ships of the line of the Royal Navy
Victorian-era ships of the line of the United Kingdom
Hospital ships of the Royal Navy
Military of Hong Kong under British rule
Ganges-class ships of the line
Royal Navy ship names
1810 ships
British military hospitals
Defunct hospitals in Hong Kong